The mountain illadopsis (Illadopsis pyrrhoptera) is a species of bird in the family Pellorneidae. It is found in the Albertine Rift montane forests, Kenya, northern Malawi and western Tanzania. Its natural habitats are subtropical or tropical dry forest and subtropical or tropical moist montane forest.

References

mountain illadopsis
Birds of Central Africa
Birds of East Africa
mountain illadopsis
Taxa named by Oscar Neumann
Taxonomy articles created by Polbot